Yeu Kashi Tashi Me Nandayla is an Indian Marathi language television program that aired on Zee Marathi. The show premiered from 4 January 2021 by replacing Tujhyat Jeev Rangala. It is produced by Tejendra Neswankar under Trrump Carrd Production. The show stars Anvita Phaltankar, Shalva Kinjavadekar, Shubhangi Gokhale, Kishori Ambiye, Dipti Samel-Ketkar and Aditi Sarangdhar.

Synopsis 
The story revolves around a middle-class girl, Avani (Sweetu), who gets hired for a job in Mumbai. Her mother Nalu asks her to stay with her mother's childhood friend, Shaku, to reduce the time needed to reach her new workplace. During their visit, Sweetu is introduced to Shaku's son Omkar. The plot then focuses on the love story between Sweetu and Omkar, and their conflict with Omkar's elder sister Malvika, who despises Sweetu and her mother due to their poor financial status.

Cast

Main 
 Anvita Phaltankar as Avani Vasant Salvi / Avani Omkar Khanvilkar (Sweetu)
 Shalva Kinjawadekar as Onkar Khanvilkar (Om)

Recurring 
Omkar's family
 Shubhangi Gokhale as Shakuntala Khanvilkar (Shaku) (January–October 2021)
 Kishori Ambiye replaced Shubhangi as Shaku (November 2021 – March 2022)
 Aditi Sarangdhar as Malvika Khanvilkar (Tayde)
 Milind Joshi as Mr. Khanvilkar
 Triyug Mantri as Rocky

Sweetu's family
 Dipti Samel-Ketkar as Nalini Vasant Salvi (Nalu)
 Uday Salvi as Vasant Salvi (Dada)
 Umesh Bane as Sharad Salvi (Kaka)
 Shubhangi Bhujbal as Suman Sharad Salvi (Kaki)
 Arnav Raje as Chinmay Sharad Salvi (Chinya)

Others
 Nikhil Raut as Mohit Parab
 Priya Marathe as Maithili
 Meera Jagannath as Monika Rao (Momo)
 Sagar Sakpal as Customer
 Komal Dhande as Mohit's mother
 Nishant Pathare as Sushil
 Manmeet Pem as Abhishek (Gattu)
 Varsha Padwal as Mamta
 Prajakta Amburle as Malvika's friend
 Mayuresh Khole as Nishant
 Suvedha Desai as Kinjal

Production

Development 
The show is produced by Trrump Carrd Production. The show is written by Kiran Kulkarni.

Filming 
The series is primarily filmed in Mumbai and Thane. On 13 April 2021, Chief Minister of Maharashtra Uddhav Thackeray announced a sudden curfew due to increased COVID-19 cases and production was suspended on 14 April 2021. The production location was temporarily moved to Daman. In early June 2021, the Government of Maharashtra allowed shooting within the state given certain restrictions. The cast and crew returned to Mumbai on 20 June 2021 and resumed filming.

Awards

Reception

Ratings

Seasons 
 8 December 2021 (6 months later)

Special episode

1 hour 
 21 February 2021
 19 December 2021

2 hours 
 16 May 2021 (Tu, Me Aani Puranpoli)
 22 August 2021 (Sweetu and Mohit's marriage)

References

External links 
Yeu Kashi Tashi Me Nandayla at ZEE5
 

2021 Indian television series debuts
Marathi-language television shows
Zee Marathi original programming
2022 Indian television series endings